Ruweisat Ridge is a geographical feature in the Western Egyptian desert, midway between the Mediterranean Sea and the Qattara Depression. During World War II was a prominent part of the defence line in the First and Second Battle of El Alamein. During the Second Battle of El Alamein, the 4th Indian Infantry Division was given the task of defending the feature.

References 

Geography of Egypt